Pelagomonas is a genus of heterokont algae. It is a monotypic genus and includes a single species, Pelagomonas calceolata which is a unicellular flagellate organism, an ubiquitous constituent of marine picoplankton. It is an ultra-planktonic marine alga.

Description
Pelagomonas calceolata is uniflagellate, about 1.5 × 3 μm in size. Microtubular roots, striated roots and a second basal body are absent. A thin organic theca surrounds most of the cell. There is a single chloroplast with a girdle lamella and a single, dense mitochondrion with tubular cristae. A single Golgi body with swelled cisternae lies beneath the flagellum, and each cell has an ejectile organelle that putatively releases a cylindrical structure. A vacuole, or cluster of vacuoles, contains the putative carbohydrate storage product.

References

Further reading
Heimann, Kirsten, Andersen, Robert A., and Wetherbee, Richard (1995) The flagellar development cycle of the uniflagellate Pelagomonas calceolata (Pelagophyceae). Journal of Phycology, 31 . pp. 577–583.

External links

WORMS entry
algae BASE entry

Ochrophyta
Protists described in 2004
Ochrophyte genera
Monotypic algae genera